Jen is a feminine given name and a surname. 

Jen or JEN may also refer to:

 JEN (charity), a Japanese humanitarian aid organisation
 Jen language, an Adamawa language of Nigeria
 Joves d'Esquerra Nacionalista, the youth wing of the Socialist Party of Majorca
 Ren (Confucianism) (Jen in Wade–Giles), a Confucian virtue